SAO biscuits are a savoury cracker biscuit that was launched in Australia in 1904 by Arnott's, the term SAO being trade marked in 1904.

The origin of the name "SAO" is unknown. A widely held belief is that the name is an acronym for "Salvation Army Officer", and was named for Arthur, one of the Arnott brothers, who was indeed an officer in the Salvation Army. The Salvation Army Australia somewhat cautiously mentions this on its website, calling it "Arguably Fact" and saying "...it is understood they named it in honour of their brother Arthur Arnott, a Salvation Army Officer. In the 1993 book The Story of Arnott's Famous Biscuits, Ross Arnott states that Sao was the name of a sailing boat which his grandfather (Arnott's founder William Arnott) saw on Lake Macquarie, of which he said "That would make a good name for a biscuit."

SAOs are often eaten as a light snack, topped with butter/margarine and Vegemite, or other ingredients. They were also a common base for home-made vanilla slice in Australian homes.

References

External links
 1951 video of manufacture of biscuits, including SAOs (2 min 24 sec video with audio)

Australian snack foods
Australian brands
Brand name crackers
1904 establishments in Australia